Eisvogel was an icebreaker in the Kriegsmarine during World War II. After the war, the ship served in the Soviet Union until 1972.

Ship description 
The ship was built for the navy in Aalborg Shipyard in Denmark, which has been occupied by Germany since April 1940, as a modified ship of the Eisbär under construction on Eriksbergs Mekaniska Verkstad in Gothenburg, Sweden. It was launched in 1942 and entered service on June 1, 1942. The ship was 61.40 m long and 15.30 m wide, had a draft of 5.90 / 6.30 m and a water displacement of 2090 t (standard) and 2913 t (fully equipped). Two standing triple expansion steam engines with a total of 3200 psi gave a top speed of 12.5 knots over two screws. The armament consisted of two 3.7 cm Flak 37 in single mounts. The crew consisted of 69 men.

Service history

Kriegsmarine 
The Eisvogel served in the Baltic Sea as an icebreaker, tugboat, escort boat and most recently in 1945 during the evacuation of German refugees from East Prussia and Pomerania. At the end of the war, the ship was sunk by its crew after its last arrival with refugees in Wismar.

Soviet Union 
Shortly after the end of the war it was lifted, repaired and delivered to the Soviet Union as spoils of war. Under the new name Alyosha Popovich (Russian Алёша Попович; named after the Russian Bogatyr Aljoscha Popowitsch) it served in the Far East until 1972. The ship was decommissioned in 1972 and laid up in the Novik Bay ("Buchta Novik") on the Russky Island near Vladivostok. There it rusted along with numerous other decommissioned units until it came to the ship cemetery in Truda Bay. In 2003, only the largely rusted outer skin of its hull could be seen there.

See also 
 Eisvogel-class icebreaker
 Eisvogel (icebreaker)

References

External links 
 Internetowy Magazyn Nautologiczny, Facta Nautica: Eisvogel
 Bauzeichnung des Schiffmodells, H.W. Sievers-Verlag

Icebreakers of Germany
Ships built in Aalborg
Ships built in Denmark
Icebreakers of the Soviet Union
1942 ships
Ships of the Kriegsmarine